The 1985 Trans America Athletic Conference baseball tournament was held at J. I. Clements Stadium on the campus of Georgia Southern in Statesboro, Georgia, on May 6 and 7. This was the seventh tournament championship held by the Trans America Athletic Conference, in its seventh year of existence.  won their second tournament championship.

Format and seeding 
The winner of each of the conference's two divisions met in a best of three series.

Bracket

All-Tournament Team 
The following players were named to the All-Tournament Team. An MVP was named for the first time in 1985.

Most Valuable Player 
Craig Cooper was named Tournament Most Valuable Player. Cooper was a first baseman for Georgia Southern.

References 

Tournament
ASUN Conference Baseball Tournament
Trans America Athletic Conference baseball tournament
Trans America Athletic Conference baseball tournament